Mohamed Camara (born 20 September 1990) is a Guinean professional footballer who plays for Olympique Saint-Quentin.

References

Mohamed Camara profile at foot-national.com

1990 births
Living people
Guinean footballers
Association football forwards
ES Troyes AC players
Ligue 2 players